Shamsher Bahadur is an Indian  politician and a member of the 16th Legislative Assembly in India. He  represents the Dhaurahra constituency  of Uttar Pradesh and is a member of the Bahujan Samaj Party political  party and he started his political career in 1990. In his early life he used to help the people no matter which religion or caste they belonged to.

Early life and  education
Shamsher Bahadur was born in Lakhimpur Kheri district. He  attended the University of Lucknow and attained Bachelor of Science  & Bachelor of Laws degrees. He is a lawyer by profession and a well known social activist, he got big responsibilities when he was only 17.

Political  career
Shamsher Bahadur has been a MLA for one  term. He defeated an ex Minister and he represented the Dhaurahra constituency and is a member of the Bahujan Samaj Party political party.

Posts held

See also
 Dhaurahra (Assembly constituency)
 Sixteenth Legislative Assembly of Uttar Pradesh
 Uttar Pradesh Legislative Assembly

References 

1967 births
Bahujan Samaj Party politicians from Uttar Pradesh
Living people
People from Lakhimpur Kheri district
Uttar Pradesh MLAs 2012–2017